Events in the year 2013 in Pakistan.

Incumbents

Federal government
 President – Asif Ali Zardari
 President (September 9 – Present) – Mamnoon Hussain
 Prime Minister (June 22, 2012 – March 16, 2013 ) – Raja Pervaiz Ashraf
 Prime Minister (June 5 – Present) – Nawaz Sharif
 Prime Minister – Caretaker (March 25, 2013 – June 4, 2013) – Mir Hazar Khan Khoso
 President – Asif Ali Zardari
 Chief Justice – Iftikhar Muhammad Chaudhry (until December 11), Tassaduq Hussain Jillani

Chief Ministers 
Here is a list of Chief Ministers of Provinces elected in General Elections 2013, Pakistan
 Chief Minister Punjab, Pakistan (June 8 – Present) – Muhammad Shahbaz Sharif
 Chief Minister Khyber Pakhtunkhwa (May 31 – Present) – Parvez Khattak
 Chief Minister Sind (May 30 – Present) – Qaim Ali Shah
 Chief Minister Balochistan (June 7 – Present) – Abdul Malik Baloch
 Chief Minister Punjab – Caretaker (March 27, 2013 – June 6, 2013) – Najam Sethi

Governors 
 Governor of Balochistan – Nawab Zulfikar Ali Magsi (until 11 June); Muhammad Khan Achakzai (starting 11 June)
 Governor of Gilgit-Baltistan – Pir Karam Ali Shah 
 Governor of Khyber Pakhtunkhwa – Syed Masood Kausar (until 10 February); Shaukatullah Khan (starting 10 February)
 Governor of Punjab – Syed Ahmed Mahmud (until 2 August); Mohammad Sarwar (starting 2 August)
 Governor of Sindh – Ishrat-ul-Ibad Khan

Events

January
 January 10 – A series of terrorist attacks killed more than 100 people in Quetta.
 January 6 – Qazi Hussain Ahmed, a political leader and Ameer of Islamic political party Jamaat-e-Islami died in Islamabad.

February

March
 March 9 – A Christian, Sawan Masih, 28 is accused of blasphemy against the Islamic prophet Muhammad in a Christian neighborhood in Badami Bagh area.
 March 25 – Mir Hazar Khan Khoso is appointed as caretaker Prime Minister of Pakistan, following the completion of the PPP-led government's term in office. Khoso will oversee the general elections scheduled in May.

April

May
 May 11 – General Elections 2013 held across Pakistan.
 May 25 – A school bus explosion kills 17 children and injures seven more in Gujrat.

June
 June 5 – Nawaz Sharif is elected Prime Minister of Pakistan, following the Pakistan Muslim League (N)'s victory in the 2013 general election.
 June 26 – June 2013 Karachi bombing

July
 July 30 – Mamnoon Hussain is elected as the 12th President of Pakistan in 2013 Presidential election, he will be sworn in on September 9.

August
 August 6 – 2013 Pakistan–Afghanistan floods
 August 14 – People of Pakistan celebrated 67th independence day of their country on August 14.

September
 September 6 – Defence Day is celebrated in Pakistan.
 September 9 – Mamnoon Hussain is sworn in as the 12th President of Pakistan.
 September 24 – A 7.7 magnitude earthquake hits Baluchistan, at least 825 people are killed and hundreds injured.
 September 25 – International Conference of Muslim Leaders, under the supervision of Syed Munawar Hassan, Chief Of Jamaat-e-Islami Pakistan, held in Mansoora, Lahore.

October
In the end of October the prime minister went to Washington DC to have a meeting with US president Barack Obama.

November
November 9 celebrated as Iqbal day in Pakistan
 November 1 – Hakimullah Mehsud, leader of Tehrik-i-Taliban Pakistan (TTP) killed by a US drone attack.
 November 29 – Pakistan Chief of Army Staff, General Ashfaq Parvez Kayani retires. General Raheel Sharif becomes the next COAS.

December
 December 11 – Chief Justice Iftikhar Muhammad Chaudhry retired from his position, he remained in the Supreme Court from 2005 to 2013, Justice Tassaduq Hussain Jillani becomes the next Supreme Court Chief Justice.

Arts

Cinema

Sport

Cricket
Domestic
 2012–13 Faysal Bank T20 Cup

International
 Pakistani cricket team in India in 2012–13
 Pakistani cricket team in South Africa in 2012–13

Deaths
January 2 – Maulvi Nazir, 37–38, Pakistani militant commander, drone strike.
January 4 – Anwar Shamim, 81, Pakistani Air Force air marshal, Chief of Air Staff (1978–1985).
January 6 – Qazi Hussain Ahmad, 74, Pakistani politician, Ameer of Jamaat-e-Islami (1987–2009), cardiac arrest.
 March 18 – Muhammad Mahmood Alam), 77, Pakistan Air Force Air Commodore (retd), Sitara-e-Jurat, died after a protracted illness.
 May 9 – Sanaullah Haq, 52?, criminal and terror suspect
 June 18 – Imran Khan Mohmand, politician who fell victim to the Mardan funeral bombing
 August 5 – Quraish Pur, 81, scholar, Urdu writer/novelist, columnist and media expert died after a protracted illness.

Public holidays

See also

 Timeline of Pakistani history
 2013 in Pakistani television
 List of Pakistani films of 2013

References

 
Pakistan
Years of the 21st century in Pakistan
2010s in Pakistan
Pakistan